Brakni Brothers Stadium, is a soccer stadium in Blida, Algeria, it has a maximum capacity of 10,000 people.  It was replaced by the bigger Stade Mustapha Tchaker currently used mostly for football matches, and for the national team since 2006.

External links
Stadium profile - Soccerway

Football venues in Algeria
Multi-purpose stadiums in Algeria
Blida
Buildings and structures in Blida Province